Chishuiella is a genus of gram-negative freshwater bacterium. It contains a single species, Chishuiella changwenlii.

References

Gram-negative bacteria
Monotypic bacteria genera
Bacteria genera